Rebecca Cavalcante Barbosa da Silva (born 23 April 1993) is a Brazilian beach volleyball player. She competed for Brazil with Ana Patrícia Ramos in women's beach volleyball at the 2020 Summer Olympics. In their match against Gaudencia Makokha and Brackcides Khadambi of Kenya in pool D they won in straight sets.

References

External links 
 
 
 
 
 Rebecca at Confederação Brasileira de Voleibol 

1993 births
Living people
Brazilian women's beach volleyball players
Olympic beach volleyball players of Brazil
Beach volleyball players at the 2020 Summer Olympics
Sportspeople from Fortaleza